Clement Manly (Lew) Llewellyn (August 1, 1895 – November 27, 1969) was a Major League Baseball pitcher. In 1 career game at the Cleveland Indians on June 18, he had a 0–0 record, with a 0.00 ERA, pitching in only 1 inning. He did not get an At bat. The Yankees lost 9–2. He batted left and threw right-handed. The Yankees listed him as being 6 feet 3.5 inches tall and weighing . He played baseball at the University of North Carolina at Chapel Hill where he was a member of Theta Chi fraternity.

Llewellyn was born in Dobson, North Carolina to James R. Llewellyn and Lula Waugh (Llewellyn). He married Ruth Spencer Pitchford. He died in Charlotte, North Carolina and is buried in Oakwood Cemetery in Concord, North Carolina.

Minor League career
Clem also played for the Buffalo Bisons in 1922 with 6 wins and 6 losses and a 6.07 ERA. In 1923 he played for the Greenville Spinners, winning 9 and losing 5 with a 5.00 ERA, and also getting 44 hits in 147 At bats for a .299 batting average and the Atlanta Crackers in 3 games, losing 2, winning none. He returned to the Spinners in 1924 and 1925, in 1924 winning 15 and losing 10 with 4.10 ERA and getting 32 hits in 139 At Bats for a .230 BA, in 1925 winning 10 and losing 13 with 4.87 ERA and getting 14 hits in 88 At bats for a .159 BA.

References
The Baseball Almanac 1922 New York Yankees
Baseball Reference Clem Llewellyn

External links
Baseball Reference.com page

1895 births
1969 deaths
People from Dobson, North Carolina
New York Yankees players
Major League Baseball pitchers
Baseball players from North Carolina